Wesam Keesh is an American actor who played Adam "Malachi" Mintock on season two of Law & Order: Organized Crime. He previously appeared in Awkward, For the People, Good Girls, NCIS: Los Angeles, and Zoobiquity and has been cast in Echo as of 2020 where he will play FBI agent Riley Burnside.

He is a native of Tulsa, Oklahoma where he attended Union High School and the University of Tulsa.

References

External links

American male television actors
Living people
Year of birth missing (living people)
People from Tulsa, Oklahoma